Hrafnhildur Hanna Þrastardóttir (born 14 May 1995) is an Icelandic handballer who plays for Icelandic top division side ÍBV and the Icelandic national team as a central back.

Career

Club career
In 2015, Hrafnhildur was the top goal scorer in the Úrvalsdeild kvenna 159 goals. She again led the league in scoring in 2016 and 2017.

National team career
Hrafnhildur was first selected to the Icelandic national team in 2014. In March 2017, Hrafnhildur tore her left ACL in a game against Netherlands.

Achievements
Úrvalsdeild kvenna top goal scorer: 2015, 2016, 2017

Club statistics

References

1995 births
Living people
Hrafnhildur Hanna Þrastardóttir
Hrafnhildur Hanna Þrastardóttir
Selfoss women's handball players